Dao Zheng (道證法師) (27 February 1957 – 18 July 2003) was a Buddhist nun from Taiwan, known for her various writings and dharma talks. She is well known for her famous painting of Amitabha, which she painted while bedridden with cancer.

Prior to entering the Buddhist order, she was a medical student and researcher.

External links
The Story of Venerable Dao Zheng
Ven. Dao Zheng's painting of Amitabha

1957 births
2003 deaths
Chinese Buddhist nuns
Chinese Zen Buddhists
Chan Buddhist monks
20th-century Buddhist nuns
21st-century Buddhist nuns
20th-century Buddhist monks